Vincent David Barton (February 1, 1908 – September 13, 1973) was a Canadian Major League Baseball outfielder for the Chicago Cubs.

Barton had a very successful rookie year for the Cubs. In only 66 games he batted .238 with 13 HRs and 50 RBIs. His 13 home runs was tied for second on the team with current Hall of Famer Hack Wilson, although Wilson played in many more games than Barton. The next season would be Barton's last year in the majors as he batted .224 in 36 games with 3 homers and 15 RBIs.

5 Home Run Game
While playing for the Hickory Rebels of the independent Carolina League on August 28, 1938, Barton hit five home runs in six at-bats.

References

External links

1908 births
1973 deaths
Albany Senators players
Allentown Dukes players
Baltimore Orioles (IL) players
Baseball people from Alberta
Birmingham Barons players
Canadian expatriate baseball players in the United States
Chicago Cubs players
Los Angeles Angels (minor league) players
Major League Baseball players from Canada
Major League Baseball right fielders
New Haven Profs players
Newark Bears (IL) players
Reading Keystones players
Sportspeople from Edmonton
Syracuse Chiefs players
Crisfield Crabbers players
Kannapolis Towelers players